Nordland Research Institute is a regional research institute based out of Bodø, Norway, and is also connected to the Nord University. They carry out research projects concerning social sciences and business management disciplines and focuses most on welfare, education, entrepreneurship, innovation, enterprise and business development, natural resource management, environment and climate change, and regional development. The staff has great expertise and a lot of the work is being done interdisciplinary. Research results are disseminated through reports, articles and lectures. Nordland Research Institute aims to conduct research, communication, development and innovation in active cooperation with private and public companies and other research institutes. They also participate actively in development processes both with private industry and the public sector. At the end of 2012, the Nordland Research Institute had 40 employees, several of whom have doctoral degrees in their field of research.

Nordland Research is a national research profile with a regional basis and performs research and development-work on behalf of the Research Council of Norway, national and regional governments, the European Union and private industries. Nordland Research Institute has several key funders. They are mainly funded by the research council of Norway, and also paid by various state, national and international clients. The institute has increased the amount of research projects funded by the county, local authorities in and outside of Nordland and local government organizations.

History
Nordland Research Institute was established in 1979, and was for the first 30 years owned by Nordland county. January 1. 2010, Nordland Research Institute was established as its own corporation. Nordland Research Institute have their offices at the University of Nordland which through time have been convenient for Nordland Research Institute considering their cooperation with the University. Nordland Research Institute has grown regularly in accordance with the school gaining University-Status. Nordland Research Institute is one of 11 regional departments. Although Nordlandsforskning is a minor institute in comparison to some other Norwegian institutions, they are still very visible in the research market. Through political jobs, welfare and research on experience-based tourism which the department is very big on, they have gained recognition from many sides, including from the King. Their biggest project so far is "The new child-protection services". A project with the family in focus and innovative practices in the home.

The most important research-areas in 2012 
Resource management, environment and climate:
The use and protection of natural resources and cultural heritage management regimes, participation in administrative processes, environmental and climate policy, as well as vulnerability and adaptability to climate change.

Research on welfare, social inclusion and employment:
Research on disability situation in different areas of life, child care services, rehabilitation-ing, young and marginalization, mental health services, inclusive workplace, health, nursing and care services, municipal services' legitimacy and legal protection for particularly vulnerable groups.

Education and School:
The implementation of education reforms, classroom research, educational and student participation. The Institute has built up a portfolio of projects on language situation and teaching targeted to the Sami population.

Entrepreneurship, innovation, enterprise and business development:
Company establishment, innovation in enterprises and innovation systems, including resource-based industries experience industries and service sectors, as well as business-related funding and industrial and regional policy.

Culture and nature-based industries and regional development:
Use of culture and nature as a basis for economic development and local community development, tourism and experience industries, innovation and strategy in agriculture and aquaculture, regional business and community development, relationship center - periphery and development of communities.

The new child-protection services
The new child-protection services is a collaboration-project between research, education and practice fields in Bodø, Rana, Sandnes, Stavanger, Kristiansand,[Vestre Toten, Ringerike, Gurgaon, Central Namdalingen, Midtbyen Trondheim, Heimdal and Molde. This project's main objective is to identify knowledge about who the users of child welfare services are, and what type of activities happens in the services. The project will provide answers on who the users of child welfare services are, the needs of users, and how child welfare services meet these needs. In addition, the project has a focus on children's mental health after interacting with child-protecting services, and cooperation between the municipal child welfare and BUP. Also, the goal is to initiate professional development in areas that local authorities consider appropriate forums to develop better practices to users of municipal services for children and young people.

References

www.Nordlandsforskning.no

 

Research institutes in Norway